The Unguarded Moment is a 1956 American crime film noir thriller film directed by Harry Keller and starring Esther Williams, George Nader, John Saxon and Edward Andrews.

Plot
Lois Conway (Williams) works as a music teacher at a local high school in a small town, where recently a woman was found murdered. When she starts receiving notes from an anonymous admirer, she suspects her favorite student Sandy (Wilder) is responsible, and tells him they could never be lovers. The notes grow more violent and when, in her latest letter, she is invited to meet at the school's lockers at night, Lois decides to visit, hoping to stop the young man. There, she is attacked by an initial shadowy figure, whom she later identifies as Leonard Bennett (Saxon), the high school's star football player.

She successfully gets away, though drops her purse, and is aided by Lieutenant Harry Graham (Nader). Graham advises her to press charges, but Lois wants to drop the matter in hopes of it blowing over.

Back at home, she notices her purse on her table, and aware that the thief is in her home, orders him to leave. As he bashes through the door to get away, Lois is now certain that Leonard is her attacker.

Leonard is able to get home without his dominant and overbearing father (Andrews) noticing he is gone. Mr. Bennett lectures his son on the dangers of women, stimulated by the occurrence of him being left by his wife and Leonard's mother when he was very ill.

The following day, Lois reports the incident to the principal Pendleton (Tremayne), but when Leonard denies the whole matter, Pendleton protects the school's most valuable athletic asset by suggesting to Lois that she should provide evidence.

Soon the story spreads around school, and with gossip surrounding Lois allegedly pursuing Leonard, both her personal and professional life becomes a mess. One day, she pulls him out of class and tries to reason with him, but he refuses to listen to her. Meanwhile, she grows closer to Graham, who does not understand why she is sympathetic to Leonard.

Nonetheless, she decides to visit the Bennetts, but the father does not want her to interfere with his son and accuses her of seducing Leonard. He is startled, though, upon finding out the police are now involved in the matter. Mr. Bennett is unaware that Leonard again sneaked out of his room to visit a waitress whom he has dated in the past.

Sometime later, Graham accompanies Lois to a football game, where Graham is inspired to retrieve Leonard's fingerprints from his locker. It turns out the fingerprints match those found at Lois' place.

At a school dance, she tries to warn Leonard about the police discovery, assuring him he will get into big trouble if he does not come clean. Leonard, for the first time, speaks truthfully to her, but they are interrupted by Mr. Bennett, who convinces Leonard Lois is manipulating him. Leonard asks her to meet him in the cloak room to discuss the matter, but Lois is unaware Mr. Bennett and Pendleton are hiding in the same room. Her presence convinces them she must be having an affair with the teenager. Lois, being tricked by Leonard, falls into Graham's arms, and finally allows him to arrest the kid.

At the police station, the now suspended Lois is brought in by Graham to get an honest confession from Leonard. During the interrogation, the couple is informed that another man has admitted to having committed the murder. Graham wants to continue prosecuting Leonard for breaking into Lois' apartment, but she wants to drop the case and orders him to bring the boy home.

Back home, Lois is about to undress, when suddenly Mr. Bennett jumps out of her closet and starts assaulting her. At the same moment, Leonard, impressed by having been forgiven by his teacher, confesses to Graham that his father is responsible for the murders. Graham decides to share the news with Lois and arrives at her home just in time to save her from being murdered by Mr. Bennett. Bennett suffers a heart attack after attempting to flee the scene, and dies in front of Leonard.

Cast
 Esther Williams as Lois Conway
 George Nader as Lt. Harry Graham
 John Saxon as Leonard Bennett
 Edward Andrews as Mr. Bennett
 Les Tremayne as Principal Pendleton
 Jack Albertson as Prof
 Dani Crayne as Josie Warren
 John Wilder as Sandy
 Edward Platt as Attorney Briggs (as Eldward C. Platt)
 Eleanor Audley as Mr. Pendleton's Secretary
 Robert Williams as Detective (as Robert B. Williams)

Production

Development
The origin of The Unguarded Moment is as surprising as Esther Williams' casting in it. According to biographer Bernard F. Dick in Forever Mame: The Life of Rosalind Russell, the story idea came from writer Larry Marcus and Rosalind Russell, as a possible vehicle for herself. (Marcus had written scripts for Russell's own production company.)

The first draft of the screenplay by Marcus and Russell (under the pseudonym C.A. McKnight, her mother's maiden name) had a working title of Teach Me to Love and was completed by 1951.

In a 1951 draft of the story, Harry Graham was a fellow teacher instead of a policeman, and Leonard Bennett was revealed to be responsible for the murders, before being killed.

In 1952 it was announced the story, called The Hidden Heart had been purchased by Benagoss Productions, who had made The Green Glove. Herbert Meadow had worked on the script and Rudolph Mate was to direct. The story had been originally set in France but was relocated to California. Possible female stars discussed in the press included Olivia de Havilland, Loretta Young and Teresa Wright. The movie was not made.

Russell had no time to work on the screenplay as she became busy with back to back Broadway productions including Wonderful Town, The Girl Rush and Picnic. As a result, she did not return to the project until 1955 when Marcus and scenarist Herb Meadow had made further revisions to the script under working titles of The Lie and The Hidden Heart.

In October 1955 it was announced Universal International had purchased the script and Gordon Kay was going to produce. (It was later estimated Russell and Marcus made $50,000 for their work on the film.)

In November Esther Williams signed on to play the lead and the film was called The Gentle Webb.

Casting
Actor John Saxon had yet to make a name for himself when the film went into production. He received the co-starring role after several screen tests, and the studio attempted to make him fill the void actor James Dean left when he died.

For Esther Williams, the film was her first since her contract ended with Metro-Goldwyn-Mayer, and it proved to be her first non-swimming dramatic role since The Hoodlum Saint (1946).

In her autobiography, she noted:
I thought it was a curious choice for Universal to offer me the lead in a 'dry' psychological thriller, and I wasn't sure the public would accept me without my glittering crowns and sparkly swimsuits. Nonetheless, Universal offered me $200,000, which was more than I ever made for a single film at MGM in or out of the water...Later, after we had started shooting, Rosalind Russell came up to me at a party and said, 'I hear you're doing my script.' I looked at her blankly until she explained that she had written it under the pseudonym C. A. McKnight. 'I wrote the part for me, but I got too old.'"

Reception
The film flopped at the box office. Saxon received warm reviews for his performance of Leonard Bennett.

Some reviewers lauded Williams' performance, others lamented her change of milieu. Russell later wrote that Williams was "very good in" the film.

The Chicago Tribune wrote that "the film is a pleasant surprise... the well knit story has suspense and the dialogue is excellent."

The Los Angeles Times wrote that "it carries enough suspense to please any but rabid devotees".

In present days, the film is regarded as a B film, despite the fact it was heavily promoted in the 1950s.

According to Turner Classic Movies, Williams "unintentionally accents [her] limitations as a dramatic actress though she still looks gorgeous. [..] While Esther Williams is the top-billed star of The Unguarded Moment, it is Andrews' unexpectedly creepy performance that hijacks the film and imbues it with an underlying mood of malice and menace."

See also
List of American films of 1956

References

External links
 
 
 
 The Unguarded Moment review at Film Noir of the Week by Wheeler Winston Dixon
 

1956 films
Film noir
1956 drama films
1950s thriller drama films
American thriller drama films
American high school films
Films about educators
Films directed by Victor Saville
Films directed by Harry Keller
Films scored by Herman Stein
Universal Pictures films
1950s English-language films
1950s American films